"Fire It Up" is the third single released by the Canadian rock band Thousand Foot Krutch from their fifth studio album Welcome to the Masquerade. It charted at No. 18 on active rock charts, No. 35 on the Billboard rock charts and No. 5 on Christianrock.net. The song is used in numerous promotions by sports teams, race drivers and in movies

Promotion
At least five hockey teams; the Hershey Bears, Nashville Predators, New York Islanders, Rockford Icehogs and Ottawa Senators use "Fire It Up" either in pre-game warm-ups or for promo videos at their games.
The Wisconsin Badgers men's hockey team uses "Fire It Up" as one of two pregame songs to get the crowd excited.
Fire It Up is featured in the video games NHL 10, MX vs ATV Reflex, and is currently available as downloadable content for Rock Band 2.
 Fire It Up is the theme tune of the Backdraft monster truck, driven by Jeremy Slifko.
NASCAR uses the song in one of its advertisements.
It was featured on the Versus Indycar Edmonton telecast in late July 2009.
The song is also used in the G.I. Joe: The Rise of Cobra trailer. It is also featured in the 2009 film, Ice Castles.
Fox Sports used the song on an NFL Promotion.
Team Canada at the World Juniors Hockey Championship used it in a promo video before games.
NFL Network used the song as the background music for their 2009 "Plays of the Year" segment.
 The song became the official song for Super Bowl.
 The song has been confirmed as a downloadable song for Rock Band.
 Fire It Up has been used by the MLB

Credits 
 Trevor McNevan - vocals, guitar
 Joel Bruyere - bass
 Steve Augustine - drums
 Pete Stewart - additional guitar

Music video
Trevor McNevan stated that a music video for the song, which will make it the first song from Welcome to the Masquerade to receive one, was in production. However, on May 9, 2010, he stated on his Facebook page that "we [TFK] shot one a while back, but hated it... so, it's on the fence there."

Other information
 Carrie Underwood has stated that she is a fan of the band and especially "Fire It Up" and "Already Home."
 The guitar solo near the end of the song is played by Pete Stewart.

Charts

References

2009 singles
Thousand Foot Krutch songs
Tooth & Nail Records singles
2009 songs
Songs written by Trevor McNevan
Christian metal songs